Mapania ferruginea is a species of plant in the sedge family, Cyperaceae. It is found in Cameroon and São Tomé and Príncipe (both São Tomé Island and Príncipe). Its natural habitat is subtropical or tropical moist montane forests. It is threatened by habitat loss.

References

Cyperaceae
Flora of Cameroon
Flora of São Tomé Island
Flora of Príncipe
Plants described in 1887
Vulnerable plants
Taxonomy articles created by Polbot